Martin Kostadinov (born 13 May 1996) is a Bulgarian professional footballer who plays as a left back for Bulgarian Second League club Dunav Ruse.

Career

Cherno More
In January 2014, Kostadinov was included in Cherno More's 25-man squad for their training camp in Turkey. Martin made his full first team début in a 4-0 away win against Lyubimets on 9 March 2014, playing as left back for 60 minutes.  On 27 October 2015, he scored his first goal for the club in a 5–0 away win over Vihar Stroevo in the Bulgarian Cup.  Kostadinov was used sparingly in the next two years following his début, but made significant progress during the 2016–17 season when he was named in the starting XI for 12 matches.  Martin won the Man of the match award in the final two league fixtures, a 1–3 home defeat by Ludogorets Razgrad on 28 May 2017 and a 2–2 away draw against Levski Sofia on 31 May 2017, when he scored his first league goal.

Kostadinov started the 2017–18 season as first team regular, playing as left back.  He won two consecutive Man of the match awards in the early rounds, a 1–0 home win over Dunav Ruse on 28 July, followed by a 1–1 away draw against Pirin Blagoevgrad on 4 August.

Arda Kardzhali
Kostadinov joined Arda Kardzhali in January 2020.

International career
Martin was included in the Bulgaria U21 squad for the friendly against Macedonia U21 on 28 March 2017. He made his debut for the team, coming on as substitute for Georgi Yomov in the second half.

Career statistics

References

External links

1996 births
Living people
Bulgarian footballers
Bulgaria youth international footballers
Bulgaria under-21 international footballers
Association football defenders
PFC Cherno More Varna players
FC Dunav Ruse players
FC Arda Kardzhali players
FC Botev Vratsa players
First Professional Football League (Bulgaria) players
Sportspeople from Varna, Bulgaria